The following are the national records in Olympic weightlifting in Vietnam. Records are maintained in each weight class for the snatch lift, clean and jerk lift, and the total for both lifts by the Weightlifting Federation of Vietnam.

Current records

Men

Women

Historical records

Men (1998–2018)

References

External links

Weightlifting
Vietnam
Records
Olympic weightlifting